Armwood Senior High School is a public high school located in Seffner, Florida, United States, on U.S. Highway 92. It opened in August 1984. The school is named after Blanche Armwood, a longtime Tampa resident, educator and activist. The school's mascot is the Hawk.

As of the 2014–15 school year, the school had an enrollment of 1,809 students and 104.0 classroom teachers (on an FTE basis), for a student–teacher ratio of 17.4:1. There were 1,227 students (67.8% of enrollment) eligible for free lunch and 167 (9.2% of students) eligible for reduced-cost lunch.

Demographics
Armwood High School is 34.3% Black, 31.7% Hispanic, 27.4% White, 1.4% Asian, 4.3% Multi-Racial, 0.5% Pacific Islander, and 0.4% American Indian.

Florida Department of Education Grade
2008 C
2009 D 
2010 C
2011 B 
2012 C
2013 C
2014 C
2015 C
2016 D
2017 C
2018 C
2019 C

Athletics
Armwood's athletic teams compete as the Hawks, using the school colors blue and black. The following sports are offered at Armwood:

Baseball (boys)
Basketball (girls & boys)
Cross country (girls & boys)
Flag football (girls)
Football (boys)
State champs - 2003, 2004
Golf (girls & boys)
Soccer (girls & boys)
Softball (girls)
Swimming (girls & boys)
Tennis (girls & boys)
Track and field (girls & boys)
Volleyball (girls)
Wrestling (boys)

In 2011, Armwood won the class 6A state championship game, but was stripped of the title after both the Hawks and their opponent, Miami Central High School, were determined to have used ineligible players.  The FHSAA subsequently vacated the title completely, leaving 2011 without a 6A champ.

The Collegiate Academy
Starting with the 2013–2014 school year Armwood High School will be home to The Collegiate Academy at Armwood High School. According to the school district's website The Academy provides students with an opportunity to earn an Associate of Arts degree (A.A.) through Hillsborough Community College in addition to their high school diploma. The students will take college courses, free of cost (including textbooks), during the school day. The Academy will not only provide academic preparation but also other types of “college knowledge”, such as self-management of study routines and preparation for assessments; handling the pace and expectations of college courses, and strategic use of resources such as college advisers and ambassadors from local college campuses.

Notable alumni
Chase Cabre, Former NASCAR Driver for Rev Racing
Jarriett Buie, NFL defensive end for the Tampa Bay Buccaneers
Byron Cowart, NFL defensive tackle for the New England Patriots
Sterling Hitchcock, retired Major League Baseball pitcher
Sterling Hofrichter, football player
Matt Jones, NFL running back for the Philadelphia Eagles
Matt Joyce, Major League Baseball player for the Oakland Athletics
Leon McQuay, NFL defensive back for the Kansas City Chiefs
Jonathan Ordway, Arena Football League player for the Chicago Rush
Mike Pearson, NFL Offensive Lineman for Jacksonville Jaguars
Eric Striker, NFL linebacker for the Buffalo Bills

References

External links
 Armwood High School official site

Educational institutions established in 1984
High schools in Hillsborough County, Florida
Public high schools in Florida
1984 establishments in Florida